Dennis Richmond (born May 26, 1943) is an American retired news anchor who spent 40 years with Oakland, California-based KTVU.

Biography

Early life
Richmond grew up in Rossford, Ohio and graduated from Rossford High School in 1961. He served in the United States Army from 1961 to 1964 with the 82nd Airborne Division. He attended Wayne State University in Detroit from 1965 to 1967. He then attended Columbia University Graduate School of Journalism in 1969 on a scholarship which he was offered while working at KTVU.

Career
He joined KTVU on April 23, 1968 as a clerk typist, and became anchor in 1976—one of the first African-Americans to become chief anchor of a major-market TV newscast.  He co-anchored alongside Barbara Simpson from 1978 to 1986. Elaine Corral served as co-anchor from 1986 to 1998, followed by Leslie Griffith through 2006. His last co-anchor was Julie Haener. During his career he and his wife settled in Pleasanton, California.

After 40 years with KTVU, including 31 as anchor, Richmond retired on May 26, 2008, his 65th birthday. By the time of his retirement, Richmond had become the highly respected dean of Bay Area TV news anchors, the longest-serving anchor in the Bay Area's history. His final show garnered 400,000 viewers, giving the newscast a 15.6 Nielsen rating and making him "more popular than Oprah". He has one daughter from a previous relationship and two grandchildren.

Frank Somerville, a longtime anchor for KTVU's morning and afternoon newscasts, succeeded Richmond as anchor of the 10 O'Clock News.

Awards
Richmond has won several awards, including the Humanitarian Award of Oakland (the highest honor given in that city) and the Black Media Coalition Journalist of the Year Award.  He was honored as the Good Scout of the year by the Boy Scouts of America San Francisco Bay Area Council in 2004.

With him leading the news team, KTVU has won several Emmys and Radio and Television News Directors Association awards.

Richmond also received an Award of Distinction from Rossford High School, as a distinguished graduate.

Honors
The old part of the San Francisco Bay Bridge was named the Dennis Richmond Bridge in his honor while the bridge was being remodeled.

Personal life
Dennis Richmond is a native of Toledo, Ohio, and served in the United States Army for three years. He gambled on driving to California without a plan; he found employment with KTVU as a typist and never left.

Richmond is a member of the board of directors of the Child Abuse Consortium, which is a California statewide government agency.  In addition to that, he has also been the General Chairperson of the YMCA fundraising drive for Alameda County. He has also served in the Oakland: Mayor's Blue Ribbon Committee to Save High School Sports.

During Richmond's years as a news anchor, his wife operated a beauty salon business. , he resides in Grass Valley, California, after previously living in San Ramon, California.

Footnotes

External links
KTVU.com - Dennis Richmond

Longtime anchor Dennis Richmond to leave KTVU in May

1943 births
Living people
African-American television personalities
American television reporters and correspondents
Wayne State University alumni
Columbia University Graduate School of Journalism alumni
People from Oakland, California
People from Rossford, Ohio
American male journalists
Journalists from Ohio
Journalists from California
United States Army soldiers
21st-century African-American people
20th-century African-American people